The Yale Bulldogs baseball team is a varsity intercollegiate athletic team of Yale University in New Haven, Connecticut, United States. The team is a member of the Ivy League, which is part of the National Collegiate Athletic Association's Division I. Yale's first baseball team was fielded in 1864. The team plays its home games at Yale Field in New Haven, Connecticut. The Bulldogs are coached by Brian Hamm.

History
The Yale Bulldogs Baseball program was founded in 1868 as a team to compete with Harvard baseball. Yale played its first baseball game on September 30, 1865 against Wesleyan College; Yale won 30 to 12. On July 23, 1868, Yale played its first championship game as an invitational against Harvard University, in which it lost 25–17. On June 5, 1869, Harvard visited Brooklyn and defeated Yale 41–24. Harvard would continue to dominate Yale in the Ivy League baseball conference, but Yale won two games in 1874.

In 1928, Yale Field was built to house the Yale baseball program. Yale's first game in their new stadium was played in 1928 against the Eastern League New Haven Professionals. The first pitch was thrown by Mayor Tower of New Haven. The result of the game was a 12–0 shutout by the road team.

Major leaguers pitcher Craig Breslow (Oakland A's and Boston Red Sox) and catcher Ryan Lavarnway (Boston Red Sox/Los Angeles Dodgers), among others, played baseball for the Bulldogs. Breslow led the Ivy League with a 2.56 ERA in 2002.  Lavarnway led the NCAA in batting average (.467) and slugging percentage (.873) in 2007, set the Ivy League hitting-streak record (25), and through 2010 held the Ivy League record in career home runs (33). In August 2012, Breslow and Lavarnway, playing for the Red Sox, became the first Yale grads to be Major League teammates since 1949, and the first All-Yale battery in the major leagues since 1883. In September 2016 the two were again battery-mates, this time playing for Team Israel in the qualifiers for the 2017 World Baseball Classic.

Major League Baseball
Bob Davis pitched for Yale and then pitched in Major League Baseball in 1958 and 1960.  Yale has had 35 Major League Baseball Draft selections since the draft began in 1965.

Notable players

National teams
 Eric Brodkowitz, Israeli-American baseball pitcher for the Israel National Baseball Team
Ryan Lavarnway, Israeli-American baseball catcher who appeared for Israel National Baseball Team
Ben Wanger, Israeli-American baseball pitcher for the Israel National Baseball Team

Others
 George H. W. Bush, 43rd Vice President of the United States, 41st President of the United States, first baseman 1947–1948
 Ron DeSantis, Governor of Florida
 Craig Breslow, MLB pitcher
 Ron Darling, MLB pitcher and broadcaster

See also
List of NCAA Division I baseball programs

References

External links